Barrack Zourie is a mountain in Schoharie County, New York. It is located north of Cobleskill. Pine Hill is located west-northwest and Mount Shank is located south-southwest of Barrack Zourie.

References

Mountains of Schoharie County, New York
Mountains of New York (state)